John Anthony Bell AO OBE FRSN (born 1 November 1940) is an Australian actor, theatre director and theatre manager.  He has been a major influence on the development of Australian theatre in the late 20th and early 21st centuries.

Early life
Bell was born 1 November 1940 in Newcastle, New South Wales, and at age 9 or 10 moved with his family to the town of Maitland, New South Wales where he was educated at the Marist Brothers.

Career
While at High School, he developed and performed one-man shows.
He worked with Old Tote Theatre Company.
He spent five years with the Royal Shakespeare Company in Great Britain
In the 1970s he taught at National Institute of Dramatic Art (NIDA).
He directed the first production of The Legend of King O'Malley (a musical play based on the life of King O'Malley by Bob Ellis and Michael Boddy) in 1970. The production featured Robyn Nevin and Kate Fitzpatrick.

He was in major state theatre companies as actor and/or director.
He was co-founder of the Nimrod Theatre Company in Sydney.
He was Producer/presenter for David Williamson's Travelling North, The Club, The Removalists and Peter Kenna's A Hard God.
In 2009 Bell directed the opera Madama Butterfly for Oz Opera; this production toured throughout Australia.

Bell Shakespeare
In 1990, Bell founded the theatre company Bell Shakespeare and has produced, among others, Hamlet, Romeo and Juliet, The Taming of the Shrew, Richard III, Pericles, Henry IV, Henry V, Julius Caesar, Antony and Cleopatra, The Comedy of Errors, The Merchant of Venice, The Tempest, King Lear, and Goldoni's Servant of Two Masters.

His roles for the company include Shylock, Richard III, Macbeth, Malvolio, Coriolanus, Leontes, Prospero, King Lear and Ulysses.

In 2011, Bell published the book On Shakespeare, his thoughts and reminiscences of playing Shakespeare for more than 50 years.

Selected credits
The Taming of the Shrew (1973) – filmed adaptation of his Old Tote performance
Hamlet (1974) – filmed adaptation of his Sydney Theatre Company performance
Far East (1982)

Personal life

Bell attended the University of Sydney with Clive James and Germaine Greer. He is a contemporary and friend of Bruce Beresford (film director, with whom he shared a house and for whom he did some film acting), Ken Horler, Mungo McCallum, Bob Ellis, Richard Wherrett, John Gaden, Laurie Oakes (journalist), and Les Murray (poet). His brother is the artist Michael Bell. Bell is married to actress Anna Volska and has two daughters, Grass Roots actress Lucy Bell and playwright Hilary Bell.

Honours and awards
In the New Year's Honours of 1978 he was appointed an Officer of the Order of the British Empire (OBE). In the Queen's Birthday Honours of 1987, he was named a Member of the Order of Australia (AM). In the Australia Day Honours of 2009, he was named an Officer of the Order of Australia (AO).

In 2001 a painting of Bell by artist Nicholas Harding won the Archibald Prize.

In 2003 the Australian Prime Minister, John Howard, presented Bell with the Cultural Leader of the Year Award.

In 2016 he was awarded Australian Humanist Of The Year.

In 2019 Bell was elected as a Fellow of the Royal Society of New South Wales (Est. 1821).

In February 2020, Bell's election as a Fellow of the Royal Society of New South Wales (FRSN, EST 1821) was promulgated by Her Excellency, the Honourable Margaret Beazley AC QC, Governor of New South Wales (NSW) in the NSW Government Gazette.

His achievements in theatre have been acknowledged by the Universities of Newcastle (1994), Sydney (1996) and New South Wales, all of whom have awarded him honorary Doctor of Letters degrees.

Helpmann Awards
The Helpmann Awards is an awards show, celebrating live entertainment and performing arts in Australia, presented by industry group Live Performance Australia (LPA) since 2001. In 2009, Bell received the JC Williamson Award, the LPA's highest honour, for their life's work in live performance.

|-
| 2002 || Himself || Helpmann Award for Best Male Actor in a Play || 
|-
| 2009 || Himself || JC Williamson Award || 
|-
| 2013 || Himself || Best Male Actor in a Play || 
|-
| 2018 || Himself || Best Male Actor in a Play || 
|-

Mo Awards
The Australian Entertainment Mo Awards (commonly known informally as the Mo Awards), were annual Australian entertainment industry awards. They recognise achievements in live entertainment in Australia from 1975 to 2016. Bell won one award in that time.
 (wins only)
|-
| 1989
| John Bell 
| Male Supporting Musical Theatre Performer of the Year 
| 
|-

References

External links

In defense of Shakespeare—a conversation with veteran Australian actor and director John Bell World Socialist Web Site (13 December 2011).

1940 births
Australian male stage actors
Australian theatre directors
Australian male Shakespearean actors
Helpmann Award winners
Living people
Australian Officers of the Order of the British Empire
Officers of the Order of Australia
Australian opera directors
People from Maitland, New South Wales
University of Newcastle (Australia) alumni